Herbert Kickl (born 19 October 1968) is an Austrian politician who has been leader of the Freedom Party of Austria (FPÖ) since June 2021. He previously served as Minister of the Interior from 2017 to 2019 and general-secretary of the FPÖ from 2005 to 2018.

Kickl rose to prominence as a campaign director for the FPÖ and speechwriter for Jörg Haider during the 2000s. After the party split in 2005, he became general-secretary and one of its key leaders. In 2017, he was appointed federal Minister of the Interior in the first Kurz government. He was dismissed from office in May 2019 in the wake of the Ibiza affair, though he was not personally implicated. He returned to the National Council, where he has been leader of the FPÖ faction since 2019.

Early life
Kickl grew up in a working-class family and attended primary school in Radenthein. He graduated high school in Spittal an der Drau alongside future Greens leader Eva Glawischnig. He did his military service with the mountain troops as a one-year volunteer from 1987 to 1988. He then began studying journalism and political science at the University of Vienna, and from 1989, philosophy and history. He did not complete either degree.

Political career
Between 1995 and 2001, Kickl worked for the FPÖ's party academy in the area of campaign strategy and content, rising to deputy executive director in 2001. After the Knittelfeld Putsch in 2002, he became executive director, a position he held until 2006. In this capacity, he was a speechwriter for long-time FPÖ leader Jörg Haider. Among other things, he wrote inflammatory statements about French president Jacques Chirac and Jewish Community of Vienna president Ariel Muzicant, and was responsible for controversial campaign slogans such as the 2010 Viennese state election slogan "Viennese blood - too much foreign is not good for anyone."

After Haider left the party in 2005 and launched the Alliance for the Future of Austria, Kickl remained with FPÖ and became one of his harshest critics. In the aftermath, Kickl was elected general-secretary of the FPÖ and director of the party newspaper Neue Freie Zeitung, positions which he held until 2018 and 2017 respectively. As general-secretary he was responsible for public relations and internal communication, and was considered the chief strategist of the FPÖ and the "right-hand man" of leader Heinz-Christian Strache. He was elected to the National Council in 2006 and served as deputy chair of the FPÖ parliamentary faction. From 2016 to 2021, he was president of the FPÖ Education Institute.

Minister of the Interior
After the 2017 Austrian legislative election, the FPÖ joined the federal government as a junior partner to the Austrian People's Party (ÖVP). Kickl was sworn in as Federal Minister of the Interior on 17 December. In this capacity, he suffered from a number of scandals. He was accused of failing to take serious responsibility as a minister, instead acting as if he were still in the opposition, as well as misusing his office and fostering a development away from liberal democracy and the rule of law.

In a press conference on 11 January 2018, Kickl said he wanted "services centres and infrastructure that would allow the authorities to concentrate asylum seekers in one place", which was widely interpreted as an allusion to concentration camps, though he denied that the phrasing was intentional or that he sought to be provocative.

In March 2018, Kickl suspended Peter Gridling, head of the Federal Office for the Protection of the Constitution and Counterterrorism (BVT), and ordered raids against its offices and the homes of a number of staff, seizing nineteen gigabytes of data. Kickl claimed that his actions were necessitated by Gridling and the agency's failure to delete sensitive data. His actions were criticised by opposition politicians, who accused him of seeking to undermine the independence of the BVT to protect right-wing extremist groups close to the FPÖ. President of Austria Alexander Van der Bellen described the events as "extremely unusual and disconcerting". Government spokesman for security Werner Amon stated that the interior ministry had failed to work through the proper channels, and that unprompted searches of staff members' homes was not normal procedure.

Kickl was criticised in September 2018 after an email addressed to the police by his ministerial spokesman surfaced recommending that they limit contact with critical media outlets to a bare minimum. This prompted criticism from Chancellor Sebastian Kurz, who condemned "any restriction of freedom of the press". Kickl stated he did not approve of the email's content, and the FPÖ accused the media of conducting a coordinated witch hunt against him. Kickl has also been accused of wielding the police for political purposes, lodging legal complaints against individuals and journalists who write negatively about him.

In January 2019, Kickl voiced his demand for faster deportation of refugees who had committed crimes, stating that deportation should be possible immediately after conviction, before full legal process has been completed. He later corrected his position, stating that the full legal process should be carried out before deportation, but further said: "I believe that it is up to the law to follow politics, and not for politics to follow the law." He questioned the necessity of human rights agreements, including the European Convention on Human Rights, claiming that they "prevent us from doing what is necessary". He received widespread criticism for his statements which were perceived as an attack against the rule of law, including from ÖVP members of the government, President Van der Bellen, various judges' and lawyers' associations, and president of the Jewish Community of Vienna Oskar Deutsch.

In early 2019, Kickl proposed to amend the constitution to allow preventive detention of asylum seekers who could be considered a threat to public safety. NEOS leader Beate Meinl-Reisinger refused to consider discussions for such an amendment, criticising detention based purely on potential danger as a feature of authoritarian regimes. Kickl also proposed a curfew for asylum seekers between 10 PM and 6 AM on a voluntary basis and commented: "If they don't want to do that, we will find a place for them where there is little incentive to hang around." He stated that the aim of a renewed tightening of asylum law was to make it virtually impossible to apply for asylum in Austria. He also announced that reception centres for refugees would be renamed to "departure centres" from March, a move which social psychologist Klaus Ottomeyer described as "pure sadism".

As interior minister, Kickl pushed to expand and strengthen the Federal Police. The programme of the ÖVP–FPÖ government included plans to hire 4,100 new police officers. In April 2018, the ministry announced that the special Vienna standby police unit would be permitted to use tasers, similar to other special units. In August, Kickl announced plans to establish standby units in all nine states. Further, a new border protection unit named Puma was established. The government also launched a pilot program to introduce mounted police, which was unsuccessful. Expenses for the project amounted to around €2.5 million, according to the Kurier.

Dismissal

On 17 May 2019, a secretly-recorded video featuring FPÖ politicians Heinz-Christian Strache and Johann Gudenus was released to the press. In the video, both men appear receptive to proposals by a woman calling herself Alyona Makarova, posing as a niece of Russian businessman Igor Makarov, who suggests providing their party with positive news coverage in return for government contracts. Strache and Gudenus also hint at corrupt practices involving other wealthy donors to the FPÖ in Europe and elsewhere. After the story broke, then-Vice-Chancellor Strache announced his resignation from all political offices.

According to Chancellor Sebastian Kurz, as general-secretary of the FPÖ, Kickl was primarily responsible for the party's financial management. He stated it would therefore be inappropriate for the interior ministry, which would conduct the investigation into the scandal, to be overseen by Kickl. For this reason, and because in Kurz's view he had not taken the severity of the situation seriously, he requested that President Alexander Van der Bellen dismiss Kickl as interior minister. He was dismissed on 22 May. Kickl thus became the first federal minister in the Second Republic to be removed from office against his will. In response, the remaining FPÖ ministers resigned and the party withdrew from the coalition, prompting Kurz to call a snap election.

FPÖ parliamentary leader
Kickl resumed his seat in the National Council on 24 May and became managing officer of the FPÖ parliamentary faction. He was re-elected in the September election. Kickl received over 75,000 personal votes, the second-highest number of any candidate behind only Sebastian Kurz, and more than twice as many as FPÖ top candidate and leader Norbert Hofer. He became chairman of the FPÖ faction after the election.

Kickl and Hofer were considered unofficial "dual leaders" and often came into conflict. While Hofer sought to take a moderate line, Kickl positioned himself as "the true party leader" and pushed for hardline stances on a number of issues. He took a strict position against the government's response to the COVID-19 pandemic, spreading misinformation, opposing vaccination, and attending anti-lockdown protests. He was criticised by Hofer over his refusal to wear a mask in the National Council.

FPÖ chairman
In May 2021, Kickl voiced his desire to run as lead candidate for the FPÖ in the next federal election. On 1 June, Hofer announced his resignation as party chairman. Kickl was the sole candidate to succeed him. He was unanimously designated as chairman by the executive committee on 7 June and confirmed on 19 June with 88% support.

Political positions
During government formation with the ÖVP in 2017, Kickl stated that his goal in politics is to "make society fairer". Society is fair, he said, when one can support one's family through gainful employment and live a self-determined life without "social dependence".

Immigration and multiculturalism
Like most in his party, Kickl strongly opposes immigration and what he describes as "the abuse of the asylum system". He believes that Islam has no place in Europe, and that integration of Muslim immigrants cannot "solve the problem of Islamic countercultures". Rather, immigration must be severely limited. As interior minister, he advocated for rapid deportation of refugees who commit crimes. He also suggested that Austria should withdraw from human rights agreements if they "prevent us from doing what is necessary", expressing his belief that "it is up to the law to follow politics, and not for politics to follow the law." He stated that the aim of his refugee policy was to make it virtually impossible to apply for asylum in Austria.

Foreign policy
Kickl supports his party's close relations with Vladimir Putin and United Russia. As interior minister in 2018, Kickl sought cooperation with the Russian government on disaster responses and the fight against organised crime and terrorism. In a radio interview, Kickl rejected criticism of the Russian president's authoritarian policies. After the 2022 Russian invasion of Ukraine, he claimed that both Russia and NATO bore responsibility for the invasion, and that sanctions imposed against Russia constituted a violation of Austrian neutrality. He also opposed plans for Austria to accept Ukrainian refugees.

COVID-19
Kickl has attended and spoken at protests against the Austrian COVID-19 response, which he characterises as "a game of power" by "those at the top [who] want to dominate us". He opposes the use of COVID-19 vaccine, describing the mass vaccination campaign in Israel as "health apartheid".

In April 2021, Kickl voiced his refusal to wear a mask in the National Council after a mandate was introduced. However, as the policy is part of the house rules rather than the parliamentary rules of procedure, there is no punishment for failing to observe it. Kickl said he was therefore not obliged to do so, as he is when shopping. He said he was "not one of those hypocrites who puts on the mask and then throws every security measure overboard".

Kickl has opposed scientific consensus on the pandemic on several occasions. Among other things, he has denied the effectiveness of vaccinations against COVID-19, and in November 2021 repeatedly recommended the anti-worm drug Ivermectin as a cure for the virus. There is no evidence that the drug has any effect in treating COVID-19 in humans. The Austrian Federal Office for Safety in Health Care has issued warnings about possible poisoning and strongly advises against self-treatment with it. Kickl's statements led to a surge in demand for Ivermectin, which sold out in many pharmacies. This was followed by reports of poisoning and hospitalisations as a result of improper use of the drug.

Personal life
Kickl is married and has a son.

On 15 November 2021, Herbert Kickl announced on Facebook that he had tested positive for COVID-19.

References

1968 births
Living people
COVID-19 misinformation
Members of the National Council (Austria)
Freedom Party of Austria politicians
Interior ministers of Austria
People from Villach
21st-century Austrian politicians